Adıyaman Province is a province in the Southeastern Anatolia Region of Turkey. The capital is Adıyaman. The province is considered part of Turkish Kurdistan and has a Kurdish majority.

Adıyaman Province was part of the province of Malatya until 1954, when it was made into a province as a reward for voting for the winning Democratic Party in the 1954 general election.

History

Early Armenian rule 
Armenian existence in Adıyaman dates back to the 4th century, where they were known as 'fire worshippers'. Armenians lived in the area when Muslim Arabs captured the area in 639. The Arabs considered the city as part of Armenia and experienced immigration from Byzantine Armenia due to Byzantine oppression in 713. The city came under Seljuk rule after the Battle of Manzikert in 1071 and the local Armenians established principalities in the area. One of these principalities was founded by Philaretos Brachamios who tried to protect the land between the Seljuk and the Byzantine. The Armenians had good relations with the European Crusader states, but the Crusader County of Edessa would advance against the Armenians in Adıyaman. Political leaders in Adıyaman were also victims of assassinations by Edessa. Wife of Kogh Vasil founded an army to protect the area from Edessa as well, but Edessa ultimately captured the area. Close relations between the Armenians and the Crusader states, however, continued until Nur ad-Din captured the area in 1150. The area came under the rule of Timurtash of the Artuqids for his support for Nur ad-Din and later the Seljuks from the beginning of the 13th century. The locals failed at removing the rulership of Kilij Arslan II during the late 12th century. In the subsequent period, the area was fought over between the Mamluk Sultanate and the Armenian Kingdom of Cilicia, changing hands between the two until it finally came under permanent Mamluk control.

Ottoman rule 
Ottoman Sultan Selim I captured the area during the Ottoman–Mamluk War in 1516-1517. In the first defter of the area in 1519, it was mentioned that the Kurdish Reşwan tribe populated the area. Documents from 1524 and 1536 also contain records of the Reşwan tribe living in the area. The tribe was engaged in agriculture after having had a nomadic lifestyle.

Evliya Çelebi visited the city in the 17th century and described the agricultural life.

At the beginning of the 19th century, most Armenians lived near the castle of Adıyaman city and mostly made their living through shop keeping and trading. In the villages, they were involved in agriculture and animal husbandry. The local Armenians welcomed American missionaries approaching them during the 19th century at first, but prevented them from converted them later on. Some of the Gregorian Armenians did however convert to Protestantism and the missionaries ultimately divided the local Armenian community. Ainsworth visited the town of Adıyaman in the 1842 and mentioned that the town contained 800 Muslim households and 300 Armenian households and that it had several mosques but no churches. After his visit to the town, he visited the Kurdish village of Kerkunah in the outskirts and afterwards Kâhta, where he mentioned that a Kurdish rebellion was taking place. Most of the rural areas spoke Kurdish in 1882, while Turkish was prevalent in Adıyaman town.

Armenian nationalism increased among the Armenians by the end of the century and most of the Armenian population fell victim to the Armenian genocide in 1915. There are, however, still some Armenians around Kâhta.

The area was part of Mamuret-ul-Aziz Vilayet as Behisni, Hasanmansur and Kahta districts.

Republican era 
The names of 224 villages in Adiyaman Province was Turkified as part of the campaign to remove any mention of Kurdishness in the country. In 1932, the whole region was chiefly populated by Kurds. The Turkish authorities put the province under State of emergency (OHAL) in the early 1990s as part of the Kurdish–Turkish conflict.

In 2023, a 7.8 magnitude earthquake hit Adıyaman.

Geography

The province consists of the districts Adıyaman (center district), Besni, Çelikhan, Gerger, Gölbaşı, Kâhta, Samsat, Sincik and Tut.

Demographics 

Out of the 339 villages in the province, 296 are populated by Kurds while the remaining 43 are populated by Turks. In terms of religious affiliation, 293 of the villages have an Hanafi population, 80 villages with an Alevi population and two villages are reported to having a Shafi'i population.

The majority of the population is Hanafi Kurdish, with a significant Kurdish Alevi population. One estimate from 2014 places the Alevi population at 11%. The province is generally more pious than other Kurdish areas in Turkey and has been a hotspot for radicalization and Islamism in recent years (see Dokumacılar). Historian Şahidin Şimşek argued that Hanafi adherents in the province had been manipulated by the state to believe that Kurdish nationalism equated to Alevism. Another theory points at the poverty in the province.

The Kurdish tribes in the province include the Alikan, Atman, Balyan, Belikan tribe, Bêzikan, Birîmşa, Bîstikan, Canbegan, Celikan, Dêrsimî, Dirêjan, Gewozî, Hevêdan, Heyderan, Hûriyan, Izol, Kawan, Kerdizan, Kîkan, Kirvar, Mirdesan, Molikan, Mukriyan, Pîrvan, Reşwan, Şavak, Sinemilli, Sînanka, Şêxbizin and the Teşikan tribe.

The Alevis of the western districts of Besni, Gölbaşı and Tut are Turkmen and Kurdish.

References

Further reading

External links

 
Provinces of Turkey
Turkish Kurdistan